This is a list of notable events in music that took place in the year 1920.

Specific locations
1920 in British music
1920 in Norwegian music

Specific genres
1920 in country music
1920 in jazz

Events
January 19 – The Salzburg Festival is revived.
September 4 – City of Birmingham Orchestra (England) first rehearses (in a city police bandroom). Later this month, its first concert, conducted by Appleby Matthews, opens with Granville Bantock's overture Saul; in November it gives its "First Symphony Concert" when Edward Elgar conducts a programme of his own music in Birmingham Town Hall.
November 15 – First complete public performance of Gustav Holst's suite The Planets given in London by the London Symphony Orchestra conducted by Albert Coates.
December 4 – Première of the opera Die tote Stadt by 23-year-old Erich Wolfgang Korngold. It later becomes known that the librettist, "Paul Schott", is Korngold's father Julius.
December 30 – Pearl Hamilton (later with the Three X Sisters), plays piano with small jazz ensemble to appreciative audience at the Star Theater in New York City.
Mamie Smith's first blues recordings become a hit, alerting record companies to the African American market.
Hamilton Harty is appointed resident conductor of the Hallé Orchestra.
Henri Sauguet forms Groupe des Trois (the Group of Three) along with Louis Emié and Jean-Marcel Lizotte.
The Central Band of the Royal Air Force is formed in Britain.
The Royal Concertgebouw Orchestra launches its Mahler festival.
Gabriel Fauré retires from the Paris Conservatoire, and is awarded the Grand-Croix of the Légion d'Honneur.

Publications
Stewart Macpherson – Melody and Harmony, Book 1. London: Stainer & Bell.

Published popular music

 "After You Get What You Want, You Don't Want It" w.m. Irving Berlin
 "All She'd Say Was "Umh Hum"" w.m. King Zany, Mac Emery, Gus Van & Joe Schenck
 "All The Boys Love Mary" Gus Van & Joe Schenck
 "Aunt Hagar's Blues" w.m. W. C. Handy
 "Avalon" w.m. B. G. DeSylva, Al Jolson & Vincent Rose
 "Blue Jeans"     w. Harry D. Kerr, m. Lou Traveller
 "Bright Eyes" w. Harry B. Smith m. Otto Motzan & M. K. Jerome
 "Broadway Rose" w. Eugene West m. Martin Fried & Otis Spencer
 "Chanson" m. Rudolf Friml
 "Chili Bean" w. Lew Brown m. Albert Von Tilzer
 "Crazy Blues" w.m. Percy Bradford
 "The Cuckoo Waltz" w. Arthur Kingsley m. J. E. Jonasson
 "Daddy, You've Been A Mother To Me" w.m. Fred Fisher
 "Do You Ever Think Of Me?" w. John Cooper & Harry D. Kerr m. Earl Burtnett
 "Down By The O-HI-O (I've Got The Sweetest Little O, My ! O ! )" w. Jack Yellen m. Abe Olman
 "Feather Your Nest" w.m. James Kendis, James Brockman & Howard Johnson
 "The Gipsy Warned Me" w.m. R. P. Weston & Bert Lee
 "Great Camp Meeting Day" w. Noble Sissle
 "He Went In Like A Lion (And Came Out Like A Lamb)" w. Andrew B. Sterling  m. Harry von Tilzer
 "Home Again Blues" w.m. Harry Akst & Irving Berlin
 "I Belong to Glasgow" w.m. Will Fyffe
 "I Never Knew I Could Love Anybody Like I'm Loving You" w.m. Tom Pitts, Raymond B. Egan & Roy Marsh
 "I Used To Love You, But It's All Over Now" w. Lew Brown m. Albert Von Tilzer
 "I'd Love To Fall Asleep And Wake Up In My Mammy's Arms" w. Sam M. Lewis & Joe Young m. Fred E. Ahlert
 "I'll Be With You In Apple Blossom Time" w. Neville Fleason m. Albert Von Tilzer
 "I'll See You In C-U-B-A" w.m. Irving Berlin
 "In a Persian Market" m. Albert William Ketèlbey
 "The Japanese Sandman" w. Raymond B. Egan m. Richard A. Whiting
 "Jellybean" by Jimmie Dupre, Sam Rosen, and Joe Verges

 "Kalua" w. Anne Caldwell m. Jerome Kern
 "La Veeda" w. Nat Vincent m. John Alden
 "Left All Alone Again Blues" w. Anne Caldwell m. Jerome Kern
 "Little Town In The Ould County Down" w. Richard Pascoe m. Monte Carlo & Alma Saunders
 "Look for the Silver Lining" w. B. G. DeSylva m. Jerome Kern
 "The Love Boat" by Gene Buck
 "Love Nest" w. Otto Harbach m. Louis A. Hirsch
 "Margie" w. Benny Davis m. Con Conrad & J. Russel Robinson
 "Mary" w. Otto Harbach m. Louis A. Hirsch
 "My Little Bimbo Down On A Bamboo Isle" w. Grant Clarke w. Walter Donaldson
 "My Mammy" w. Sam M. Lewis & Joe Young m. Walter Donaldson
 "My Man" w. (Eng) Channing Pollock (Fr) Albert Willemetz & Jacques Charles m. Maurice Yvain
 "O'er The Hills To Ardentinny" w.m. Harry Lauder
 "Old Pal Why Don't You Answer Me" w. Sam M. Lewis & Joe Young m. M. K. Jerome
 "Pale Moon" w. Jesse Glick m. Frederick Knight Logan
 "Palesteena" w.m. Con Conrad & J. Russell Robinson
 "Polly" w. Leo Wood m. Jack Richmond
 "Pretty Kitty Kelly" w. Harry Pease m. Ed G. Nelson
 "Rose Of Washington Square" w. Ballard MacDonald m. James F. Hanley
 "San" w.m. Lindsay McPhail & Walter Michels
 "So Long, Oo Long" w. Bert Kalmar m. Harry Ruby
 "Tell Me Little Gypsy" w.m. Irving Berlin
 "That Old Irish Mother Of Mine" w. William Jerome m. Harry Von Tilzer
 "Wang Wang Blues" w. Leo Wood m. Gus Mueller, Buster Johnson & Henry Busse
 "When My Baby Smiles At Me" w. Andrew B. Sterling m. Billy Munro
 "Where Do They Go When They Row, Row, Row?" w. Bert Kalmar & George Jessel, m. Harry Ruby
 "Whispering" w. Malvin Schonberger m. John Schonberger
 "White Army, Black Baron" w. Pavel Grigor'ev, m. Samuel Pokrass
 "Whose Baby Are You?" w. Anne Caldwell m. Jerome Kern
 "Wild Rose" w. Clifford Grey m. Jerome Kern
 "A Young Man's Fancy" w. John Murray Anderson & Jack Yellen m. Milton Ager

Top Popular Recordings 1920

The following songs achieved the highest positions in Joel Whitburn's Pop Memories 1890-1954 and record sales reported on the "Discography of American Historical Recordings" website during 1920: Numerical rankings are approximate, they are only used as a frame of reference.

Classical music
Granville Bantock – Arabian Nights
 Béla Bartók – Eight Improvisations on Peasant Songs
 Arnold Bax – Phantasy for viola and orchestra
 Arthur Bliss – The Tempest, overture and interludes;
Concerto for piano, tenor voice, strings and percussion
Rout (for soprano and chamber orchestra)
 Ernest Bloch – Violin Sonata No. 1
 Max Bruch - String Octet
 Ferruccio Busoni – Piano Sonatina No. 6 (Fantasia da camera super Carmen), 
Divertimento for flute and orchestra
 Frederick Delius – Hassan
 George Enescu – String Quartet No. 1 in E-flat major, Op. 22, No. 1
 Gabriel Fauré – Masques et Bergamasques
 Johan Halvorsen – Norwegian Rhapsody No. 2
 Arthur Honegger – Pastorale d'été
Viola Sonata
Cello Sonata
 Leoš Janáček – Ballad of Blanik (symphonic poem)
 Darius Milhaud – Ballade (for piano and orchestra)
Le Boeuf sur le toit (ballet), 
 Francis Poulenc – Five Impromptus for Piano, Suite in C Major for Piano
 Sergei Prokofiev – Five Songs without Words (for voice and piano)
 Maurice Ravel – La Valse
Sonata for violin and cello
 Erik Satie – La Belle excentrique
 Dmitri Shostakovich – Five Preludes for piano
 Igor Stravinsky – Concertino for string quartet,
Pulcinella  
Symphonies of Wind Instruments
 Ralph Vaughan Williams – The Lark Ascending
Mass in G minor
 Heitor Villa-Lobos – Symphony No. 5, "A paz" (Peace)

Opera
 Vincent D'Indy – The Legend of St. Christoper
Clemens Freiherr von Franckenstein – Li-Tai-Pe
Henry Hadley – Cleopatra's Night
Leoš Janáček – The Excursions of Mr. Broucek on the Moon and in the 15th Century
Erich Korngold – Die tote Stadt
Ruggiero Leoncavallo – Edipo Re

Jazz

Musical theatre
 Afgar  Broadway production opened at the Central Theatre on November 8 and ran for 168 performances
 As You Were Broadway revue by Arthur Wimperis opened at the Central Theatre on January 27 and ran for 143 performances.  Starring Sam Bernard, Irene Bordoni, Clifton Webb and Hugh Cameron.
 The Beggar's Opera London production opened at the Lyric Theatre, Hammersmith on June 5 and ran for 1,463 performances
Die Blaue Mazur (The Blue Mazurka) (Music by Franz Lehár), Vienna
 George White's Scandals Of 1920 Broadway revue opened at the Globe Theatre on June 7 and ran for 134 performances
 The Gingham Girl Broadway production (music by Albert Von Tilzer) at the Central Theatre ran for 322 performances
 Irene London production opened at the Empire Theatre on April 7 and ran for 399 performances
 Johnny Jones London production opened at the Alhambra Theatre on June 1 and ran for 349 performances
 Jumble Sale London revue opened at the Vaudeville Theatre on December 16 and ran for 176 performances
 Just Fancy London production opened at the Vaudeville Theatre on March 26 and ran for 332 performances
 Der letzte Walzer (The Last Waltz) (Music by Oscar Straus), Berlin
 A Little Dutch Girl opened at the Lyric Theatre on December 1 and ran for 207 performances
The Night Boat Broadway production opened at the Liberty Theatre on February 2 and ran for 318 performances.  Jeanette MacDonald made her first Broadway appearance as a member of the chorus.
 A Night Out London production opened at the Winter Garden Theatre on September 18 and ran for 309 performances
 Sally Broadway production opened at the New Amsterdam Theatre on December 21 and ran for 570 performances
 The Shop Girl London revival opened at the Gaiety Theatre on March 25 and ran for 327 performances
 Tickle Me ( Music: Herbert P. Stothart) Broadway production opened at the Selwyn Theatre on August 17 and ran for 207 performances.  Starring Louise Allen, Allen Kearns and Frank Tinney.
 Tip Top Broadway production opened at the Globe Theatre on October 5 and ran for 241 performances
 Ziegfeld Follies of 1920 Broadway revue opened at the New Amsterdam Theatre on June 22 and ran for 123 performances, but ran most years until 1927.

Births
January 1
José Antonio Bottiroli, Argentine composer and poet (d. 1990)
Virgilio Savona, Italian singer and songwriter (Quartetto Cetra) (d. 2009)
Mahmoud Zoufonoun, Iranian-American violinist (d. 2013)
January 3 – Renato Carosone, Italian musician and singer (d. 2001)
January 5 – Arturo Benedetti Michelangeli, pianist (d. 1995)
January 8 – Josef Josephi, Polish-born singer and actor (b. 1852)
January 14
 Cris Alexander, American actor, singer, dancer, designer, and photographer (d. 2012)
 Salvador Flores Rivera, Mexican composer and singer (d. 1987)
January 16 – Claude Abadie, French jazz clarinetist (died 2020)
February 2
 Heikki Suolahti, Finnish composer (d. 1936)
 Yuriko Amemiya, American dancer and choreographer (d. 2022)
February 7 – Oscar Brand, Canadian-born American folk singer, songwriter and author (d. 2016)
February 12 – Yoshiko Yamaguchi, Chinese-Japanese actress and singer (d. 2014)
February 13
Boudleaux Bryant, American songwriter (d. 1987)
Eileen Farrell, American soprano (d. 2002)
February 14 – Albert J. McNeil, American choral conductor, ethnomusicologist and author (d. 2022)
February 18 – Rolande Falcinelli, organist, pianist and composer (d. 2006)
February 23 – Hall Overton, composer, jazz pianist and music teacher (d. 1972)
February 26 – Henri Crolla, jazz guitarist and film composer (d. 1960)
February 28 – Albert Elms, light music composer (d. 2009)
March 10 – Boris Vian, French writer, poet, singer and musician (d. 1959)
March 16 – John Addison, British film composer (d. 1998)
March 17 – John La Montaine, American composer (d. 2013)
March 22 – Fanny Waterman, pianist and music educator (d. 2020)
March 23 – Geoffrey Bush, British composer, writer and broadcaster (d. 1998)
April 7 – Ravi Shankar, Indian sitarist (d. 2012)
April 12 
The Cox Twins, music hall entertainers (Frank, d. 2007; Fred, d. 2013)
Anita Ellis, Canadian-American singer and actress (d. 2015)
April 21 – Bruno Maderna, conductor and composer (d. 1973)
April 23 – Louis Barron, film composer (d. 1989)
April 27 – Guido Cantelli, Italian conductor (d. 1956)
April 29 – Harold Shapero, composer (d. 2013)
May 2 – Jean-Marie Auberson, violinist and conductor (d. 2004)
May 4 – Ronald Chesney, harmonica player and comedy scriptwriter (d. 2018)
May 13 – Gareth Morris, flautist (d. 2007)
May 18 – Lucia Mannucci, Italian singer (Quartetto Cetra) (d. 2012)
May 20 – Betty Driver, British singer and actress (d. 2011)
May 21 – Bill Barber, jazz musician (d. 2007)
May 23 – Helen O'Connell, American big band singer (d. 1993)
May 26 – Peggy Lee, singer and songwriter (d. 2002)
June 6
Dino Asciolla, violinist (d. 1994)
Jan Rubeš, Czech-Canadian bass opera singer, actor (d. 2009)
Robert Turner, composer (d. 2012)
June 10 – Bonnie Davis, R&B singer (d. 1976)
June 11 – Hazel Scott, jazz/classical pianist and singer (d. 1981)
June 19 – Johnny Douglas, film composer and conductor (d. 2003)
June 20 – Danny Cedrone, American guitarist and bandleader (d. 1954)
June 25 – Ozan Marsh, American concert pianist (d. 1992)
June 26 – Leonid Hambro, pianist (d. 2006)
July 1 – Amália Rodrigues, Portuguese singer and actress (d. 1999)
July 13
 Anna Halprin, American dancer (d. 2021)
 Don Ralke, American music arranger (d. 2000)
July 14 – Marijohn Wilkin, country and gospel songwriter (d. 2006)
July 19 – Robert Mann, violinist (d. 2018)
July 20 
Carmen Carrozza, accordionist (d. 2013)
Thanga Darlong, Indian folk musician 
July 21 
Isaac Stern, Ukrainian-born violinist (d. 2001)
Manuel Valls, composer (d. 1984)
 July 23 – Amália Rodrigues, Portuguese fado singer and actress (d. 1999)
 July 31 – Walter Arlen, American composer 
August 7 – Françoise Adret, French ballet dancer, choreographer (d. 2018)
August 8
Leo Chiosso, Italian lyricist (d. 2006)
Jimmy Witherspoon, blues singer (d. 1997)
August 26 – Emil Cadkin, film composer (d. 2020)
August 29 – Charlie Parker, jazz musician (d. 1955)
September 3 – Chabuca Granda, Peruvian singer and composer (d. 1983)
September 7 – Al Caiola, American guitarist, composer, arranger (d. 2016)
September 14 – Cascarita [a.k.a. Orlando Guerra], Cuban music singer (d. 1975)
September 17 – Jean Perrin, composer (d. 1989)
September 23 
Alexander Arutiunian, Armenian composer (d. 2012)
Mickey Rooney, actor and entertainer (d. 2014)
September 25 – Anne Triola, American actress, singer and musician (d. 2012)
September 28 – Irma Baltuttis, singer and entertainer (d. 1958)
October 5 – Vincent DeRosa, American musician (d. 2022)
October 9 – Yusef Lateef, American jazz musician and composer (d. 2013)
October 13 – Albert Hague, songwriter (d. 2001)
October 24 – Steve Conway, British singer (d. 1952)
October 27 – Nanette Fabray, actress and singer (d. 2018)
October 31 – Joseph Gelineau, French composer (d. 2008)
November 23 – Enrico De Angelis, Italian singer and entrepreneur (d. 2018)
December 6 – Dave Brubeck, jazz pianist (d. 2012)
December 13 – Teo Usuelli, Italian film composer (d. 2009)
December 14 – Clark Terry, American jazz musician and composer (d. 2015)
December 19 – Little Jimmy Dickens, American country music singer-songwriter (d. 2015)
December 31 – Rex Allen, American actor, singer and songwriter (d. 1999)
date unknown – Jan Van Halen, musician, father of Eddie and Alex Van Halen

Deaths
January 8 – Maud Powell, violinist (b. 1867)
January 16 – Reginald De Koven, US music critic and composer (b. 1859)
January 18 – Giovanni Capurro, poet, co-writer of "O Sole Mio" (b. 1859)
January 21 – John Henry Maunder, composer (b. 1858)
January 24 – William Percy French, songwriter (b. 1854)
February 2 – Theo Marzials, singer and composer (b. 1850)
February 11 – Gaby Deslys, dancer and actress (b. 1881)
February 12 – Émile Sauret, violinist and composer (b. 1852)
February 23 – Alexander Ilyinsky, music teacher and composer (b. 1859)
March 20 – Eva Mylott, operatic contralto (b. 1875) (domestic accident)
April 4 – Carl Bohm, pianist and composer (b. 1844)
April 8 – Charles Griffes, composer (b. 1884; Spanish flu)
April 19 – Mathilde Mallinger, lyric soprano (b. 1847)
May 6 – Hortense Schneider, operatic soprano (b. 1833)
May 25 – Georg Jarno, composer of operettas (b. 1868)
May 28 – Hardwicke Rawnsley, hymn-writer (b. 1851)
June 27 – Adolphe-Basile Routhier, lyricist (b. 1839)
June 28 – Pauline Rita, singer and actress (b. c.1842)
July 17 – Dorothy Goetz, first wife of Irving Berlin (b. 1892) (typhoid)
July 26 – Carlos Troyer, composer (b. 1837)
August 13 – Carlos Hartling, German-born composer of the Honduras national anthem (b. 1869)
August 29 – Gustav Jenner, composer and conductor (b. 1865)
October 1 – Vladimir Rebikov, Russian pianist and composer (b. 1866)
October 2 – Max Bruch, composer (b. 1838)
October 16 – Alberto Nepomuceno, composer and conductor (b. 1864)
November 6 – Maria Waldmann, operatic mezzo-soprano associated with Verdi (b. 1844)
December 14 – George J. Gaskin, singer (b. 1863)
December 31 – Paloke Kurti, Albanian composer (b. 1860)

References

 
20th century in music
Music by year